The Cathedrals Group (officially the Council of Church Universities and Colleges or CCUC) is an association of universities and university colleges in the United Kingdom. All the member institutions, except St David's College, Lampeter of the University of Wales Trinity Saint David, were founded as teacher training colleges by either the Church of England, Roman Catholic Church or Methodist Church.

Members

 Bishop Grosseteste University
 Canterbury Christ Church University
 University of Chester
 University of Chichester
 University of Cumbria
 University of Gloucestershire
 Leeds Trinity University
 Liverpool Hope University
 Newman University, Birmingham
 Plymouth Marjon University
 Roehampton University
 St Mary's University, Twickenham
 University of Wales Trinity Saint David
 University of Winchester
 York St. John University

Former member
 Heythrop College, University of London – began as a Jesuit seminary and closed in 2019

External links
 

College and university associations and consortia in the United Kingdom